Justė Veronika Jocytė (born 19 November 2005) is a Lithuanian professional basketball player for Lyon ASVEL women's club of the Ligue Féminine de Basketball and its youth academy. She plays at the shooting guard and small forward positions.

Professional career
On 11 October 2019, Jocytė made a solid debut in the Lithuanian Women's Basketball League, scoring 21 points, grabbing 5 rebounds, making 3 steals and dishing out 5 assists, and led her team Neptūnas Klaipėda to a 81–59 victory versus the Kibirkštis–Viči Vilnius.

In November 2019, Jocytė signed a three-years deal with the Tony Parker's Lyon ASVEL women's club and joined its youth team in the same month. On 8 December 2019, being 14 years and 19 days old, Jocytė became the youngest player to debut in the Ligue Féminine de Basketball, which is the top women's French professional basketball league. On 18 December 2019, Jocytė became the youngest player (14 years and 29 days old) to debut in the modern EuroLeague Women, which is the highest professional basketball league in Europe for women's clubs.

National team career
At just 13 years old, Jocytė led the Lithuanian U16 Women's National Team to the silver medal during the 2019 FIBA U16 Women's European Championship in North Macedonia. She was named to the All-Star Five after averaging 19.6 points, 8.3 rebounds and 2.1 assists in the tournament.

On 8 October 2019, Jocytė was invited to the Lithuania women's national basketball team. Still being 13 years old, she made her debut in the primary women's national team on 14 November 2019 during the EuroBasket Women 2019 qualification game in Kėdainiai and scored 4 points, grabbed 1 rebound and dished out 3 assists, helping her national team to defeat the Albania women's national basketball team 108–43.

On 14 August 2022, Jocytė led the national Lithuania basketball team and won gold in the FIBA U18 Women's European Championship 2022 finals against Spain.

Personal life
Jocytė was born in Washington, D. C., the United States. Her father, Alvydas Jocys, played basketball during his studies in Nebraska College, in the United States. When the family returned to Palanga, Lithuania, her father continued to play the game in the amateur league. Her paternal uncle played basketball professionally for KK Olimpas in Lithuania. She began attending basketball trainings in Palanga, her first coach was Daiva Mažionienė. After two years she moved to Klaipėda and began training with coach Ramunė Kumpienė.

References

2005 births
Basketball players from Washington, D.C.
Living people
Lithuanian expatriate basketball people in France
Lithuanian women's basketball players
Shooting guards
Small forwards